Alan Blacker (born July 1972, in Rochdale) is a former English solicitor advocate. Blacker first became known for being criticised for his appearance when attending court. Subsequently, Blacker was struck off after questions were asked about various qualifications and awards that he claimed to have received. Later Blacker was found guilty of benefit fraud.

Legal career
Blacker volunteered in the office of then-MP Lorna Fitzsimons between 2002 and 2004. Blacker qualified as a solicitor in 2010, and in 2011 registered JAFLAS (Joint Armed Forces Legal Advocacy Service) as a charity. JAFLAS is not related to the UK armed forces. In 2013 the Solicitors Regulatory Authority (SRA) wrote to Blacker to tell him to remove the SRA number from JAFLAS notepaper as it was likely to mislead people into thinking that JAFLAS was "an authorised and regulated legal services provider”, when it was not. 

In August 2014 Alan Blacker, who was at Cardiff Crown Court acting as defence counsel for a man who was subsequently jailed for five years for causing death by dangerous driving, was criticised by Judge David Wynn Morgan for appearing in court wearing various medals and ribbons on his robes. Morgan described Blacker as appearing "like something out of Harry Potter", and said that if Blacker appeared before him looking like that again he would decline to hear him. Morgan also questioned Blacker, who called himself "Lord Harley of Counsel" regarding his claim to an Irish peerage. Blacker complained to the Judicial Conduct Investigations Office (JCIO) about Morgan's comments, however in July 2015 the JCIO cleared Morgan of any wrong-doing. In 2015 Blacker appeared on the ITV program Parking Wars.

In September 2014 an investigation published by Wales Online into Alan Blacker's qualifications concluded that he did not have many of the qualifications, awards, and titles that he claimed to have. These included being a member of the Order of St John, a fellow of the Institute of Health Care Management, having been an honorary colonel in the Royal Artillery Association, having received a summa cum laude degree from Oxford University, having attended Trinity College, and his claimed Irish peerage. Blacker complained to the Independent Press Standards Organisation regarding the report, but the complaint was not upheld.

The SRA then began an investigation into Blacker. The investigation resulted in proceedings before the Solicitors Disciplinary Tribunal (SDT) of the SRA. Blacker sought an injunction against the SDT in relation to an alleged breach of the Equality Act. but the injunction was refused. Blacker declined to send documents or attend a hearing before the SRA panel due to what he claimed was an injury he incurred whilst performing CPR. The SRA panel found seven allegations of misconduct to have been proved against Blacker, including failures to maintain proper written accounts for client moneys and failing to obtain an accountant's report, as well as making misleading comments about his academic qualifications and accreditations, using titles that were misleading, and failing to cooperate with the regulator. As a result of the panel's decision, Blacker was struck off as a solicitor and ordered to pay the SRA's costs. In another hearing Blacker's reasons for not attending the original SRA panel were found "unconvincing" and he was ordered to pay further costs. He appealed both decisions to the High Court but his appeal was dismissed with costs.

Subsequent life
In 2018 Blacker was bankrupted by the SRA over a failure to pay costs owed to them in relation to his being struck-off. In November 2019 Blacker was found guilty of benefit fraud at Minshull Street Crown Court in Manchester. In January 2020 he was given a 9-month sentence suspended for two years.  In January 2022, he was excluded from the membership of the Chartered Institute of Legal Executives (CILEX) for failing to disclose, when applying for membership of CILEX, his striking off, bankruptcy or criminal conviction.  Blacker was banned from reapplying to CILEX for at least 10 years.

Because of Blacker's conviction for benefit fraud, he was automatically disqualified from acting as a trustee of any UK charity, such as JAFLAS.   Blacker applied to the Charity Commission for the automatic disqualification to be lifted, but they refused; Blacker then appealed to the First Tier Tribunal who refused his appeal.   The Charity Commission subsequently opened an investigation into whether Blacker continued to act as a charity trustee of JAFLAS.  Appearing before the tribunal, Blacker claimed that he had successfully sued the SRA for libel, a claim the SRA denied, and that the judge before the tribunal anyway dismissed due to lack of corroborating evidence - a lack that Blacker blamed on a non-disclosure agreement that he alleged had been signed with the SRA.

References 

1972 births
Living people
People from Rochdale
People convicted of fraud
Hoaxes in the United Kingdom
Impostors